Go Skateboarding Day (GSD) is an annual promotional event organized by the International Association of Skateboard Companies (IASC). It grew from the All Star City Skate Jam held by Kerel "SriKala" Roach and Bryan Chin in 2002 in New York City, and was renamed Go Skate Day in 2004.

History

Go Skateboarding Day was created in 2004 by the International Association of Skateboard Companies (IASC) to help make skateboarding more accessible through events held in major cities around the world. In 2006, more than 350 events took place in 32 countries. The following year, the IASC received Special Congressional Recognition from US Congresswoman Loretta Sanchez for its work in promoting skateboarding and encouraging young people to get outside and practice the sport.

Celebrations and events in 2014

Hundreds of people skated in Albany, New York.

In the west country of the UK, Erik Ellington, Spencer Hamilton, Dee Ostrander and Lizard King joined Bristol locals such as Korahn Gayle, Josh Arnott, Paul Carter, and Dave Snaddon to celebrate Go Skateboarding Day in 2014.

Thousands of skaters were present at Hollenbeck Skate Plaza, Louisiana.

North Florida's Hemming Plaza hosts an annual Go Skate Day celebration.

Nike sponsored a large Go Skateboarding Day event in Cologne, Germany.

The charity organisation Skatistan has been celebrating Go Skateboarding Day in Afghanistan since 2009. In 2014, their events also spread to Cambodia and South Africa. More than 150 students and their families and friends joined street parades in Kabul and over 200 attended celebrations in Mazar-e-Sharif.

Vans holds an annual celebration of Go Skate Day in Singapore. In 2014, hundreds of skaters went to Sommerset Skate Park for the event.

Hundreds of skateboarders joined in to celebrate Go Skateboarding Day in Lima, Peru.

2007 YouTube arrest incident 
Some skaters celebrating Go Skateboarding Day have had conflicts with the law. One of the more notable incidents involved skaters Matt McCormack, Skylar Nalls, Robbie Brindley, Casey Canterbury and several other friends in Hot Springs, Arkansas, where they were involved in an incident with police. Baird and the involved skaters contend that the police used excessive force when they arrested them; the police maintain that the officer was enforcing a city ordinance. The incident made headlines when a YouTube video of the arrest was uploaded, being viewed three million times, followed by intense internet debate over the incident.

References

External links
History of go skateboarding day in NYC BY Steve Rodriguez

Skateboarding
June observances
Unofficial observances
Recurring events established in 2004